Chirnside Park (also known as Avalon Airport Oval due to naming rights) is an Australian rules football ground in Werribee, Victoria, Australia, located between Watton Street and the Werribee River.

Chirnside Park is the home ground of Victorian Football League team Werribee Tigers who have played at the ground since their inception in 1965. For the 2011 VFL season, Williamstown Football Club played the majority of its home games at Chirnside Park while their home ground Burbank Oval is being redeveloped. Western Region Football League first division finals have been played at the venue since 2011.

Chirnside Park has a main social club building on the wing with terracing for spectators. A small wooden grandstand, believed to date to the 1910s or 1920s, is situated in the forward pocket next to it. Floodlights were recently installed at the ground, and night matches have been played there since 2011.

In February 1967 the Polish Sports Festival held its first event at the venue, with spectator numbers reaching 3,000. It was such a success that it caused the Polish community to call Chirnside Park home for its sports festivals for the next nine years, until 1976.

The total capacity is around the 10,000-mark. In 1982, an estimated 10,000 spectators saw Werribee's first ever match against VFA powerhouse Port Melbourne, which Werribee won by one point.

The wider Chirnside Park area, outside the fenced football ground, also contains tennis courts, a public swimming pool, and the Werribee Bowling Club.

References

External links

Victorian Football League grounds
Sports venues in Melbourne
Sport in the City of Wyndham
Werribee, Victoria
AFL Women's grounds
Buildings and structures in the City of Wyndham